Collected Stories may refer to:

The Collected Stories of Katherine Anne Porter, published 1965
The Collected Stories of Jean Stafford, published 1969
Collected Ghost Stories, a collection of stories by Mary E. Wilkins-Freeman, published 1974
The Collected Stories of Frank O'Connor, published 1981
The Collected Stories of Eudora Welty, published 1982
The Collected Stories of Philip K. Dick, published 1987
Ernest Hemingway: The Collected Stories, published 1995
Collected Stories (play), a 1996 play by Donald Margulies
The Collected Stories of Arthur C. Clarke, published 2001
The Collected Stories of Vernor Vinge, published 2001
The Collected Stories of Amy Hempel, published 2006

See also
The Collected Books of Jack Spicer (1975)
Collected works (disambiguation)
Collected Poems (disambiguation)